Kateřina Emmons (also Emmonsová), née Kůrková (born 17 November 1983) is a Czech sport shooter who won three Olympic medals. She competed in the 2004 Summer Olympics, where she won a bronze medal, and the 2008 Summer Olympics, where she won her first gold medal in the women's 10 metre air rifle competition, as well as a silver medal in the 50 metre rifle three positions event.

In addition to her Olympic achievements, Emmons won gold at the 2002 ISSF World Shooting Championships in the 10 metre air rifle competition, and a silver medal four years later in 2006.

Career 
Emmons went to the 2004 Summer Olympics, where she won a bronze medal in the 10 metre air rifle competition and finished 27th in her second event, the 50 metre rifle three positions event. In Beijing in 2008, she won the first gold medal of the 2008 Summer Olympics ahead of 2004 champion and favourite for the competition, Du Li. Emmons equalled the world record and set a new Olympic Record in the qualifying round by achieving a maximum score of 400. She then proceeded to set a new Olympic Record in the final by scoring a total of 503.5 points. She won a silver medal in the 50 metre rifle three positions event at the same games.

Emmons took part in her third Olympic Games in 2012, although did not win a medal, finishing fourth in the 10 metre air rifle competition. She placed 32nd in the 50 metre rifle three positions.

In 2018 it was announced that Emmons had been appointed as a consultant shooting coach with the Czech biathlon team.

Olympic results

Records

Personal life 
Emmons is married to American Olympic rifle shooter Matthew Emmons. They met at the 2004 Olympic Games in Athens while she was commentating for Czech Television, and married in Plzeň on 30 June 2007. They both live and train in Plzeň. Her father currently coaches the Australian shooting team. Their daughter, Julie, was born in 2009. They have two more children together: Martin Henry and Emma.

References

External links 
 Kateřina Emmons on the 2008 Beijing Olympics website

1983 births
Living people
ISSF rifle shooters
Czech expatriate sportspeople in the United States
Czech female sport shooters
Olympic shooters of the Czech Republic
Shooters at the 2004 Summer Olympics
Shooters at the 2008 Summer Olympics
Shooters at the 2012 Summer Olympics
Olympic gold medalists for the Czech Republic
Olympic silver medalists for the Czech Republic
Olympic bronze medalists for the Czech Republic
World record holders in shooting
Sportspeople from Plzeň
Olympic medalists in shooting
Medalists at the 2008 Summer Olympics
Medalists at the 2004 Summer Olympics
Czech sports coaches